XOK is the third studio album by Canadian alternative country band NQ Arbuckle. It was released on June 10, 2008, on Six Shooter Records.

The album received generally favourable reviews, and was nominated for the Roots & Traditional Album of the Year (Group) at the 2009 Juno Awards.

Track listing

References

2008 albums
NQ Arbuckle albums
Six Shooter Records albums